The 2022 Southeastern Louisiana Lady Lions softball team represented Southeastern Louisiana University during the 2022 NCAA Division I softball season. The Lady Lions played their home games at North Oak Park and were led by seventh-year head coach Rick Fremin. They were members of the Southland Conference.

Preseason

Southland Conference Coaches Poll
The Southland Conference Coaches Poll was released on February 4, 2022. Southeastern Louisiana was picked to finish third in the Southland Conference with 113 votes.

Preseason All-Southland team

First Team
Caitlyn Brockway (HBU, JR, 1st Base)
Cayla Jones (NSU, SR, 2nd Base)
Lindsey Rizzo (SELA, SR, 3rd Base)
Ashleigh Sgambelluri (TAMUCC, JR, Shortstop)
Chloe Gomez (MCNS, SO, Catcher)
Kaylee Lopez (MCNS, JR, Designated Player)
Jil Poullard (MCNS, SO, Outfielder)
Audrey Greely (SELA, SO, Outfielder)
Aeriyl Mass (SELA, SR, Outfielder)
Pal Egan (TAMUCC, JR, Outfielder)
Lyndie Swanson (HBU, R-FR, Pitcher)
Whitney Tate (MCNS, SO, Pitcher)
Jasie Roberts (HBU, R-FR, Utility)

Second Team
Haley Moore (TAMUCC, SO, 1st Base)
Shelby Echols (HBU, SO, 2nd Base)
Autumn Sydlik (HBU, JR, 3rd Base)
Keely DuBois (NSU, SO, Shortstop)
Bailey Krolczyk (SELA, SO, Catcher)
Lexi Johnson (SELA, SO, Designated Player)
Toni Perrin (MCNS, SR, Outfielder)
Cam Goodman (SELA, SO, Outfielder)
Alexandria Torres (TAMUCC, SO, Outfielder)
Ashley Vallejo (MCNS, SO, Pitcher)
Heather Zumo (SELA, SR, Pitcher)
Beatriz Lara (TAMUCC, JR, Pitcher)
Melise Gossen (NICH, JR, Utility)

National Softball Signing Day

Personnel

Schedule and results

Schedule Source:*Rankings are based on the team's current ranking in the NFCA/USA Softball poll.

References

Southeastern Louisiana
Southeastern Louisiana Lady Lions softball
Southeastern Louisiana Lady Lions softball